Rosato is an Italian surname, not to be confused with Rossato. Notable people with the surname include:

Cristina Rosato (born 1983), Canadian actress
Ken Rosato (born 1967), American television journalist and news show anchor
Roberto Rosato (1943–2010), Italian professional football player
Sal Rosato (1918–1959), American professional football player
Tony Rosato (1954-2017), Italian-Canadian actor

Italian-language surnames